Peter Pass  (8 March 1933 – 3 June 2012) was a British water polo player. He competed in the men's tournament at the 1956 Summer Olympics. He was inducted into the Guinness Book of World Records in 1972 for the most career caps of any British water polo player—a total of 95—and received an MBE that same year.

In club water polo, he played for Polytechnic's first team for 21 seasons between 1949 and 1970, then was a coach. From 1964 to 1994, Polytechnic won 17 National Water Polo League titles.

In his later years, Pass lived in County Offaly, Ireland. He died in 2012 of bowel cancer.

References

1933 births
2012 deaths
British male water polo players
Olympic water polo players of Great Britain
Water polo players at the 1956 Summer Olympics
Sportspeople from London